Sphecodes heraclei is a species of sweat bee in the family Halictidae.

Subspecies
These two subspecies belong to the species Sphecodes heraclei:
 Sphecodes heraclei heraclei
 Sphecodes heraclei ignitus

References

Further reading

 

Halictidae
Articles created by Qbugbot
Insects described in 1897